The Science and Technology Select Committee is a select committee of the House of Commons in the Parliament of the United Kingdom.

The original Science and Technology Committee was abolished upon the creation of the Innovation, Universities, Science and Skills Committee on 6 November 2007. However, just 19 months later, the government announced that it was re-establishing the committee following the recommendation of the Innovation, Universities, Science and Skills Committee after the merging of the Department for Business, Enterprise and Regulatory Reform and the Department for Innovation, Universities and Skills in June 2009. The House of Commons approved the re-establishment of the committee on 25 June 2009. The committee was officially re-established on 1 October 2009 and has a remit to examine the work of the Government Office for Science. The committee currently scrutinises the Department for Science, Innovation and Technology, headed by the Secretary of State for Science, Innovation and Technology, Michelle Donelan.

21st Report - Balance and effectiveness of research and innovation spending

Terms of Reference 
In May 2018, UK Research & Innovation (UKRI) published its Strategic Prospectus, which represents "the beginning of the process to develop a detailed Research and Innovation Strategy". It states that "We will work with Government to develop a plan for meeting this target [to increase the UK’s investment in research and development to 2.4% of GDP by 2027, and in the future to 3%, maximising the impact of public investment in research and innovation, and supporting business and other partners to invest more". It envisages ongoing work on "what constitutes reasonable balance" of its funding. Against that background, the committee undertook an inquiry on the balance and effectiveness of research and innovation spending.

Membership
The Right Honourable Greg Clark was elected as the new chair in the 58th parliament in January 2020. He defeated fellow Conservative MP Stephen Metcalfe. He stood down as chair following his appointment to the cabinet as Levelling Up, Housing and Communities Secretary, but was re-elected unopposed to the position in October 2022. As of July 2022, membership is as follows:

Changes since 2019

2017-2019 Parliament 
The election of the chair took place on 12 July 2017, with the members of the committee being announced on 11 September 2017.

Changes 2017-2019

2015-2017 Parliament
The chair was elected on 18 June 2015, with members being announced on 13 July 2015.

Changes 2015-2017

2010-2015 Parliament
The chair was elected on 10 June 2010, with members being announced on 12 July 2010.

Changes 2010-2015

See also
Parliamentary Committees of the United Kingdom
Science and Technology Committee (House of Lords)
Science and technology

References

External links
Records of the Science and Technology Committee are held in the Parliamentary Archives
Science and Technology Committee (Commons)  web page

Science and technology in the United Kingdom
Politics of science
Select Committees of the British House of Commons